The "Makarych" is a family of Russian non-lethal gas pistols with the ability to fire ammunition with rubber bullets.

It was developed jointly by the ZAO TSSZ "Kolchuga" and FGUP Izhevsk Mechanical Plant and is based on the Soviet Makarov pistol.

Variants

Izhevsk Mechanical Plant 
 IZH-79-9T "Makarych" (ИЖ-79-9Т «Макарыч») - first model, 8-round, 9 мм P.A. cartridge, production started in February 2004
 IZH-79-9TM "Makarych" (ИЖ-79-9ТМ) - second model, 8-round, 9 мм P.A. cartridge, production started in 2006. Since September 2008, produced under designation МР-79-9ТМ
 MP-471 - 8-round, designed in 2004, production started in 2005, 10x23 mm cartridge. Available only for private security companies
 IZH-79-9TM-10 (ИЖ-79-9ТМ-10) - 10-round, 9 мм P.A. cartridge. Since September 2008, produced under designation МР-79-9ТМ-10
 МР-80-13Т - new model, 6-round, .45 Rubber cartridge

Ukrainian derivatives 
Several Ukrainian manufacturers converts Soviet Makarov pistols into non-lethal gas pistols with the ability to fire ammunition with rubber bullets:
 "Berkut" ("Беркут") -  8-round, 9 мм P.A. cartridge (produced by OOO "Berkut", Dnepropetrovsk). 1257 Soviet Makarov pistols were converted into "Berkut" non-lethal pistols
 PMR (ПМР) - 8-round, 9 мм P.A. cartridge (produced by OOO "SOBR", Kharkov)
 PMR .45 Rubber (ПМР .45 Rubber) - 6-round, .45 Rubber cartridge (produced by OOO "SOBR", Kharkov)
 PM-RF (ПМ-РФ) - 8-round, 9 мм P.A. cartridge (produced by RPC Fort, Vinnitsa)
 PM-T (ПМ-Т) and PM-GT (ПМ-ГТ) - 8-round, 9 мм P.A. cartridge (produced by "ERMA-Inter", Kyiv)
  PMSh-1 (ПМШ1) - 8-round, 9 мм P.A. cartridge (since 2011 produced by OOO UNSP «Шмайсер», Vasylkiv)

Legal status
  - The use of non-lethal weapons in Kazakhstan is permitted to civil population, and it is also used by private security guards
  - The use of non-lethal weapons in Russia is permitted to civil population, and it is also used by private security. A permit to purchase, possess, or carry a self-defense non-lethal weapon must be obtained from the police department.
  - Ukrainian pistols are allowed for private security guards

References

Sources 
 К. И. Куценко, И. Ю. Макаров. Возможности судебно-медицинской оценки повреждений одежды, причинённых холостым выстрелом из пистолета MP-79-TM // журнал «Судебно-медицинская экспертиза», No. 2, 2013. стр.7-11

External links 
 Official site
 IZMASH site

Non-lethal firearms of Russia
Semi-automatic pistols of Russia
Izhevsk Mechanical Plant products